Ram Kinkar (1922-2003) was an Indian politician. He was elected to the Lok Sabha, the lower house of the Parliament of India from the Barabanki, Uttar Pradesh constituency of Uttar Pradesh as a member of the Janata Party. He was Deputy Minister for Education, Social Welfare, Food & Civil Supplies, Revenue etc. from February 17, to July 15, 1970 and the Cabinet Minister for Sales Tax in Uttar Pradesh Government from July to October, 1970 and for Forest, November, 1970 to March 1971.

He was Minister of State in the Ministry of Works and Housing and Supply and Rehabilitation in Morarji Desai Cabinet from August 1977 to June 1978. He resigned from the Government on June 30, 1978, and rejoined the Ministry on January 26, 1979, with the same portfolio but as Cabinet Minister for Works and Housing and Supply and Rehabilitation in Charan Singh Cabinet from July 28, 1979, to January 13, 1980.

Kinkar died on September 12, 2003, in New Delhi at the age of 82.

References

External links
Official Biographical Sketch in Lok Sabha Website

India MPs 1977–1979
India MPs 1980–1984
Janata Party politicians
1922 births
2003 deaths
Indian National Congress politicians
Bharatiya Lok Dal politicians
People from Pratapgarh district, Uttar Pradesh
Lok Sabha members from Uttar Pradesh
Uttar Pradesh MLAs 1952–1957
Uttar Pradesh MLAs 1957–1962
Uttar Pradesh MLAs 1962–1967
Uttar Pradesh MLAs 1967–1969
Uttar Pradesh MLAs 1969–1974
Janata Party (Secular) politicians